British Politics is a quarterly peer-reviewed academic journal covering British political studies published by Palgrave Macmillan. The Senior Editors are Peter Kerr (University of Birmingham) and Steven Kettell (University of Warwick), and the editors are Christopher Byrne (Leeds Beckett University) and Nick Randall (Newcastle University).

Abstracting and indexing
The journal is abstracted and indexed in:

 International Political Science Abstracts
 Sociological Abstracts
 Worldwide Political Science Abstracts
 Social Sciences Citation Index. 

According to the Journal Citation Reports, the journal has a 2020 impact factor of 2.540.

References

External links

Political science journals
Publications established in 2006
English-language journals
Quarterly journals
Palgrave Macmillan academic journals
2006 establishments in the United Kingdom
Political science in the United Kingdom